In mathematics, the quantum Markov chain is a reformulation of the ideas of a classical Markov chain, replacing the classical definitions of probability with quantum probability.

Introduction
Very roughly, the theory of a quantum Markov chain resembles that of a measure-many automaton, with some important substitutions: the initial state is to be replaced by a density matrix, and the projection operators are to be replaced by positive operator valued measures.

Formal statement
More precisely, a quantum Markov chain is a pair  with  a density matrix and  a quantum channel such that

is a completely positive trace-preserving map, and  a C*-algebra of bounded operators. The pair must obey the quantum Markov condition, that
 

for all .

See also
Quantum walk

References

Gudder, Stanley. "Quantum Markov chains." Journal of Mathematical Physics 49.7 (2008): 072105.

Exotic probabilities
Quantum information science
Markov models